Mr. Naive (Aghaye Halou, also Romanized as Āghā-ye Hālū, also released as Mr. Gullible) is a 1971 Iranian drama film directed by Dariush Mehrjui. It was entered into the 7th Moscow International Film Festival.

Cast
 Ali Nassirian
 Ezzatolah Entezami
 Fakhri Khorvash
 Mohamad Ali Keshavarz
 Enayat Bakhshi

References

External links
 

1971 films
1971 comedy-drama films
Iranian comedy-drama films
1970s Persian-language films
Iranian black-and-white films
Films directed by Dariush Mehrjui
Films based on works by Ali Nassirian